Joel Othén (born September 6, 1985) is a Swedish Bandy player who currently plays for Sandvikens AIK as a goalkeeper.  Joel was brought up by Skutskärs IF but moved when he was still young to go to Sandvikens AIK.  Joel has played for the Swedish youth team.

His list of clubs is as follows-
 Skutskärs IF
 Sandvikens AIK (2003-2013, 2016-)
 SKA-Neftyanik (2013-2016)

External links
 
 

Swedish bandy players
Living people
1985 births
Sandvikens AIK players
SKA-Neftyanik players
Expatriate bandy players in Russia
Place of birth missing (living people)